Loch Brittle is a sea loch on the southwest coast of Skye in Scotland. A sandy beach separates Glen Brittle from Loch Brittle. The land to the sides of the loch contains the hills of Beinn an Eoin and Ceanne na Beinne and the point of Rubh' an Dunain.

Brittle
Brittle